Padua Playwrights Productions, or Padua, is a Los Angeles-based theater company founded in 1978 by playwright and poet Murray Mednick. The site-specific Workshop/Festival ceased operation in 1995 and reemerged in 2001 under the artistic direction of Guy Zimmerman.

Padua Hills Playwrights' Workshop/Festival

In 1978, Mednick received funding from La Verne University to found the Padua Hills Playwrights' Workshop at the crumbling Padua Hills estate in the San Gabriel foothills. He and five other playwrights, among them Theatre Genesis colleagues Sam Shepard and Maria Irene Fornes, met with nine writing students and established a pattern of exercises, rehearsals, and informal presentations. Most of those were site-specific, since the estate had plenty of outdoor spaces but no theater to work in. Between 1984 and 1995 Padua moved around Southern California, hosting festivals at Cal Arts, Pacific Design Center, Cal State Northridge, Woodbury College and USC. Many prominent playwrights and actors participated in the Workshop/Festival, some very early in their careers, including John Steppling, John O'Keefe, Jon Robin Baitz and Kelly Stuart.

Padua took an intellectual, non-careerist approach to playwriting. In his essay "Ghosts and Shadows," published in the LA Weekly, founding member John Steppling cites this as one of the reasons Padua didn't garner as much press as he felt that it should have.  Padua's focus on the artistic process, as opposed to the final product, made it difficult to market. “It’s easy to see how Padua never acquired a 'franchise,'” he says, “Padua had nothing to 'sell.'"

One overarching practice in many Padua Hills Festival plays was their site-specificity. Mednick stressed reliance on “language in relation to space” in his teaching ". The plays were all very much connected to the physical environment they were performed in. A 1985 production of Mednick's Coyote Cycle, for example, took place from sundown to sunrise outdoors at the Paramount Ranch in the Santa Monica Mountains. Audience members huddled in sleeping bags were led from one part of the ranch to another by flashlight between scenes.

The Padua Hills Workshop/Theater Company ceased operations in 1995, citing financial difficulties.

Padua Hills Press

In 1994, Padua Hills Press published Best of the West, an anthology of eight works staged in 1989-1991, and went on to publish various, like: Plays from the Padua Hills Playwrights Festivals (2003); 3 Plays by Murray Mednick (2003); The Coyote Cycle by Murray Mednick (2003); Hipsters in Distress (2005); Plays for a New Millennium (2004); and the forthcoming Beneath the Dusty Trees: The Gary Plays, and Fever Dreams; Padua Hills Press is distributed nationally by Theatre Communications Group.

Padua Playwrights Productions

In 2001, Padua returned as Padua Playwrights Productions. Mednick appointed playwright and director Guy Zimmerman as the artistic director. The new Padua was a more traditional theater company in that it took place indoors. Otherwise, the work it produced was very much in line with the anti-institutional, pro-playwright stance of its predecessor. “[Padua means] being an outlaw and misfit within the theater community. We need Padua for artistic nourishment, ” said Roxanne Rogers, a director and original Padua participant, upon the founding of the new Padua. In its first three seasons the company staged 12 productions, including three in New York City. Garnered a host of LA Weekly, Garland, Los Angeles Drama Critics Circle awards, an American Theatre Critics Association Harold, and Mimi Steinberg/ATCA New Play Award.

Productions, 1978–1995

Selected Productions, 2001–Present

References

External links

The official website for the film adaptation of Murray Mednick's Girl on a Bed

Theatre companies in Los Angeles